What About Us may refer to:

 What About Us (Livin Out Loud album), or the title song
 What About Us? (Ruth-Ann Boyle album), or the title song
 "What About Us?" (Brandy song), 2002
 "What About Us" (Jodeci song), 1994
 "What About Us" (Pink song), 2017
 "What About Us" (The Coasters song), 1959
 "What About Us" (The Saturdays song), 2012
 "What About Us?" (Total song), 1997
 "What About Us", a song by ATB from Future Memories
 "What About Us?", a song by John Barrowman from Music Music Music
 "What About Us?", a song by Ministry from Greatest Fits
 "What About Us", an early version by Michael Jackson, later "Earth Song"
 "What About Us", a song by Ella Henderson from her second studio album Everything I Didn't Say (2022)

See also
 Paradise (What About Us?), a song by Within Temptation featuring Tarja Turunen